Sutneria is a genus of small ammonites from the Upper Jurassic (Kimmeridgian) of Europe (Germany).  Its shell is generally evolute with a narrowly rounded whorl section and tubercles along the lower flanks.

Sutneria is assigned to the Aulicostephanidae, part of the superfamily Perisphinctoidea.

References

Sutneria playnota in jsdammonites.fr 
Donovan, D.t. et al. 1981. Classification of the Jurassic Ammonitina. The Ammonoidea, Systematics Assoc. special volume 18

Ammonitida
Jurassic ammonites